Edward Johnson (March 1860 – 30 June 1901) was an English footballer who played for Stoke and the England national team. He scored Stoke's first goal in the FA Cup and is also the club's first player to be capped.

Club career
Johnson was born in Stoke-upon-Trent and by the 1870s he was attending the Saltley College in Birmingham where he played a number of sports including association football. He returned to his home town and started playing for Stoke where he played and scored in the club's first competitive match in the FA Cup which was against Manchester in a 2–1 defeat. He retired due to injury without playing in any more competitive fixtures for Stoke and later worked for the Staffordshire Football Association.

International career
Johnson played twice for England firstly against Wales in 1880 and against Ireland in 1884. He scored twice against Ireland in an 8–1 win for England.

Career statistics

Club

International
Source:

References

English footballers
Stoke City F.C. players
England international footballers
English Football League players
1860 births
1901 deaths
Association football forwards